William Patrick Twomey Sr. (14 May 1899 - 25 March 1977) was an Australian rules footballer who played for Collingwood and Hawthorn in the Victorian Football League (VFL).

Family
The son of Michael Twomey and Annie Twomey, née Carey, William Patrick Twomey was born in Heidelberg, Victoria on 14 May 1899.

He married Rose Ellen Lovett (1893-1984) in 1926.

He died in Balwyn, Victoria on 25 March 1977.

Three of his four sons Mick, Pat, and Bill, and his grandson, David Twomey – the son of his fourth son, Peter – all played league football with Collingwood.

Football
Twomey possessed exceptional pace and was thus used mainly as a wingman although he also played occasionally as a centreman and half back. In five seasons with Collingwood he played 54 games, including their 1919 premiership as well as in three losing grand finals. He represented Victoria in an interstate match against South Australia in 1921.

After leaving Collingwood at the end of the 1922 season to concentrate on an athletics career, Twomey had success as a sprinter winning the 1924 Stawell Gift. He later turned to football, joining Hawthorn in 1933 as captain-coach. Hawthorn finished in 11th position for both of his seasons in charge, the latter in a non-playing capacity although he did appear in one match that year.

He was also briefly a boundary umpire, officiating in three league games.

Footnotes

References
 Holmesby, Russell and Main, Jim (2007). The Encyclopedia of AFL Footballers. 7th ed. Melbourne: Bas Publishing.
 Ross, J. (ed), 100 Years of Australian Football 1897–1996: The Complete Story of the AFL, All the Big Stories, All the Great Pictures, All the Champions, Every AFL Season Reported, Viking, (Ringwood), 1996.

External links

 
 Coaching record at AFL Tables
 Profile at Collingwood Forever
 Boyles Football Photos: Bill Twomey b1899.

1899 births
Australian rules footballers from Melbourne
Collingwood Football Club players
Collingwood Football Club Premiership players
Hawthorn Football Club players
Hawthorn Football Club coaches
Heidelberg Football Club players
Australian Football League umpires
Australian male sprinters
Stawell Gift winners
1977 deaths
One-time VFL/AFL Premiership players
People from Heidelberg, Victoria